David H. Faber (born March 10, 1964) is an American financial journalist and market news analyst for the television cable network CNBC.  He is currently one of the co-hosts of CNBC's morning show Squawk on the Street.

Career
Faber joined CNBC in 1993 after seven years at Institutional Investor. He has been dubbed "The Brain" by CNBC co-workers, and has hosted several documentaries on corporations, such as Wal-Mart and eBay. The Age of Walmart earned Faber a 2005 Peabody Award and an Alfred I. duPont-Columbia University Award for Broadcast Journalism. In 2010, he shared the Gerald Loeb Award for Television Enterprise business journalism for "House of Cards."

In addition to Squawk on the Street, Faber hosts the network's monthly program, Business Nation, which debuted on January 24, 2007.

Faber is the author of three books; The Faber Report (2002), And Then the Roof Caved In (2009), and House of Cards: The Origins of the Collapse (2010).

Faber served as a guest host on Jeopardy! from August 2–6, 2021. Faber was the champion of Celebrity Jeopardy! in 2012.

Personal life
Faber is Jewish and was raised in Queens, New York.   He is a 1985 cum laude graduate of Tufts University, where he earned a Bachelor of Arts degree in English.

In 2000, Faber married Jenny Harris, who is a business journalist and television producer.  She is the daughter of lawyer Jay Harris (Hall Dickler Kent Goldstein & Wood) and As the World Turns actress Marie Masters and fraternal twin sister of musician Jesse Harris.

See also
 New Yorkers in journalism

References

External links
David Faber Biography. – CNBC TV Profiles. – CNBC.com.

1964 births
Living people
Tufts University School of Arts and Sciences alumni
Gerald Loeb Award winners for Television
Place of birth missing (living people)
CNBC people
American business and financial journalists
American male journalists
Jewish American journalists
Journalists from New York City
People from Queens, New York
21st-century American Jews 
Jeopardy!